Dr Dharmasena Attygalle (19 February 1925–1 June 1989) was an MP in Sri Lanka's parliament from 1972 to 1982.

He served as the Deputy Minister of Health (1977–1980) and Minister of Indigenous Medicine (1980–1982) representing the Kesbewa electorate.

He was appointed as High Commissioner to Pakistan in January 1983.

He was an Ayurveda practitioner by profession and was educated at Nalanda College Colombo.

See also
Sri Lankan Non Career Diplomats

References

 

High Commissioners of Sri Lanka to Pakistan
Deputy ministers of Sri Lanka
Non-cabinet ministers of Sri Lanka
Members of the 7th Parliament of Ceylon
Members of the 8th Parliament of Sri Lanka
Sri Lankan Ayurvedic practitioners
Sinhalese politicians
Sri Lankan Buddhists
Alumni of Nalanda College, Colombo
1989 deaths
1925 births